Donkinavalasa is a village and panchayat in Badangi mandal of Vizianagaram district, Andhra Pradesh, India. It is located about 42 km from Vizianagaram city. There is a railway station in the Vizianagaram-Raipur section of East Coast Railway, Indian Railways.

Demographics
 Indian census, the demographic details of this village is as follows:
 Total Population: 	1,034 in 251 Households
 Male Population: 	482
 Female Population: 	552
 Children Under 6-years of age: 106 (Boys - 48 and Girls - 58)
 Total Literates: 	432

References

Villages in Vizianagaram district